is a retired Japanese professional baseball pitcher. He played in Nippon Professional Baseball (Chunichi Dragons, Yomiuri Giants) and the KBO League. He threw a four-seam fastball, a slider, and a fork ball.

Biography
After 13 years in NPB, Kadokura made his debut in the Korea Baseball Organization with the SK Wyverns in 2009. He signed with the Samsung Lions in January 2011.

As of 2019, Kadokura will be serving as a pitching coach for the Chunichi Dragons' second team.

On May 15, 2021, he resigned as a coach.

Kadokura had gone missing in 2021, but resurfaced after 22 days.

See also
List of solved missing person cases

References

1973 births
2020s missing person cases
Chunichi Dragons players
Formerly missing people
Japanese baseball coaches
Japanese expatriate baseball players in South Korea
Living people
Missing person cases in Japan
Nippon Professional Baseball coaches
Nippon Professional Baseball pitchers
Osaka Kintetsu Buffaloes players
People from Iruma, Saitama
Samsung Lions players
SSG Landers players
Yokohama BayStars players
Yomiuri Giants players